Bezu is an area and school in Plumtree, Zimbabwe. Most areas in Plumtree are named according to the nearest schools. Bezu has a Primary and Secondary School.

In the surrounding area of about twenty-five square kilo metres, Bezu Secondary is the only High School in the area, meaning that other Primary schools also send their children to Bezu Secondary School for higher education. Such schools are situated around the 5 km radius of Bezu, meaning that the children have to travel long distance to gain access to the school. Such schools are Mlomwe Primary School, Pumuza Primary School, Bezu Primary School, Kandana primary school and Gwambe Primary School.

Currently there is a non-profit organization, Bezu Development Trust (BDT), aimed at developing Bezu Secondary School and other Primary Schools in the areas whose children attend this school for higher education. These schools were all built over forty years ago and are starting to fall apart. Thus, Bezu Development Trust is there help renovate them, helping children have access to a clean learning environment. The NGO also assists needy learners with uniforms, stationary and other learning equipment. Currently Bezu Secondary School has no Library and BDT is looking into building one for the school. As an NGO, BDT is looking for sponsors to help built the future of these children and give them a better and clean learning environment.

Populated places in Matabeleland South Province